The Nötsch Formation is a geologic formation in the Carnic Alps of southern Austria. It preserves fossils dating back to the Serpukhovian to Moscovian stages of the Carboniferous period.

Fossil content 
The following fossils were reported from the formation:

Arachnids
 Aphantomartus pustulatus

Ophiocistioidea
 Anguloserra austriaca
 A. carinthiaca
 Rotasaccus sp.

See also 
 List of fossiliferous stratigraphic units in Austria

References

Bibliography 
 
 

Geologic formations of Austria
Carboniferous System of Europe
Carboniferous Austria
Moscovian (Carboniferous)
Bashkirian
Serpukhovian
Conglomerate formations
Siltstone formations
Carboniferous southern paleotemperate deposits
Paleontology in Austria
Formations